Tunnel is a 2017 South Korean television series starring Choi Jin-hyuk, Yoon Hyun-min and Lee Yoo-young. It replaced Voice and aired on cable network OCN on Saturdays and Sundays in the 22:00 (KST) time slot from March 25 to May 21, 2017 for 16 episodes. The series was inspired by the Hwaseong serial murders.

The series was a hit in China. It received a Thai remake in 2019, and an Indonesian remake was announced in 2020.

Synopsis
In 1986, Park Gwang-ho works as a successful detective in an enthusiastic manner. However, his life changes when he takes the lead in a serial homicide case and when he passes through a tunnel while chasing the "culprit". He time travels 30 years into the future (2016), where he meets a new partner, Kim Seon-jae, an eccentric elite detective that has a high ability in investigation. When the serial killer continues his "modus operandi" of his murders that happened 30 years ago, the detective duo works together with a Criminal psychologist, Professor Shin Jae-yi to solve the unsolved murders and to catch the murderer.

Cast

Main
 Choi Jin-hyuk as Park Gwang-ho
 Hwayang police station's criminal sergeant detective mysteriously disappeared in 1986 and appears in 2016.
 Yoon Hyun-min as Kim Seon-jae
 Kim Seul-woo as child Seon-jae (Ep. 16)
 Hwayang police station's elite criminal lieutenant detective in 2016.
 Lee Yoo-young as Shin Jae-yi
 Kim Se-hee as Park Yeon-ho (Jae-yi's name in the childhood)
 Lee Da-kyung as teenage Jae-yi
 Park Gwang-ho and Shin Yeon-sook's only daughter. University professor and criminal psychological counselor in 2016.

Supporting

Criminal Team 1
 Jo Hee-bong as Jeon Sung-sik
 Kim Dong-young as young Jeon Sung-sik
 Hwayang police station's criminal team 1 leader in 2016, previously a criminal corporal detective and the youngest of his team in 1986.
 Kim Byung-chul as criminal detective Kwak Tae-hee
 Kang Ki-young as criminal detective Song Min-ha

Extended
 Lee Si-a as Shin Yeon-sook
 Park Gwang-ho's wife in 1986. She died in a car accident in 1991.
  as Mok Jin-woo
 Choi Seung-hoon as child Jin-woo
  as teenage Jin-woo (Ep. 12)
 Hwayang University's Faculty of Medicine forensic doctor in 2016. He was actually the real culprit of the mysterious 1986 Hwayang serial killings.
  as reporter Oh / Oh Ji-hoon
 Reporter Oh who often searched for information at Hwayang police station in 1986; now as a taxi driver in 2016 who wants to become a police officer, named Oh Ji-hoon.
 Cha Hak-yeon as Park Gwang-ho
 Criminal corporal police in 2016 with three years of experience, also named Park Gwang-ho but born in 1988, the youngest of team 1 but missed since the first day of transferring work and entangled in an unexplained pursuit leading to his death.
  as leader Oh
 Hwayang police station's criminal department leader in 1986.
 Moon Sook as Hong Hye-won
 Psychologist and the president of Hwayang University in 2016.
 Yoo Ji-soo as Lee Nan-young, Kim Seon-jae's stepmother (Ep. 5, 7, 8)

Case characters

Women Mass Murder Case at Hwayang in 1985–1986 (Ep. 1-3
 Heo Sung-tae as Jung Ho-young
 Ham Sung-min as young Jung Ho-young
N/A as Lee Jeong-sook
 First victim, her corpse was discovered in a field.
 N/A as Kim Kyung-soon
High school student and the second victim, her corpse was discovered at Haein riverside.
  as Hwang Choon-hee
 Rose cafe's staff and the third victim. Her corpse was discovered at the reeds area near Sungyoo mountain.
 Seok Bo-bae as Seo Yi-soo
 Kim Wan's wife and Kim Seon-jae's mother. She was the fourth victim who was killed on the way back home, at the bare ground near the military base.
  as Kim Wan
 Seo Yi-soo's husband and Kim Seon-jae's father. He was a military officer in 1986.
 Kim Hye-yoon as young Kim Young-ja
 The fifth victim but still alive at this time, then she changed her name as Kim Jeong-hye.
 N/A as Jin Seon-mi
 The sixth victim who was killed in a tunnel, which is the beginning of Park Gwang-ho's disappearance after he met again the perpetrator.

Suicide at Hwayang Psychiatric Hospital (former Hwayang Chapel) in 2016 (Ep. 2)
  as Lee Seon-ok
 Shin Na-ae as Lee Seon-ok in 1986
 Victim. Mental patient in 2016, previously a murder suspect in 1986 and captured in 1990 after three murders.

Kim Jeong-hye's Murder Case in 2016 (Ep. 2–3)
 Jo Shi-nae as Kim Jeong-hye 
 Victim of this case, previously named Kim Young-ja. (see the case above)
  as Kim Tae-soo
 Murder perpetrator. He had feelings for the victim but wasn't reciprocated because of his fake hand.
  as Jang Young-cheol, victim's ex-husband
  as hostess of Ho motel where the victim has been staying
  as Jang Young-cheol's motel owner
 Sung Hyun-mi as owner of the restaurant where the victim often came to eat alone

Local House Robbery and Yoon Dong-woo's Murder Case in 2016 (Ep. 4)
 Choi Won-hong as Yoon Dong-woo
 Choi Myung-bin as Yoon Soo-jeong, Dong-woo's younger sister
  as Noh Young-jin
 SAFE security company's former employee was fired for theft, one of the roberry perpetrators in the local houses protected by SAFE was arrested at the scene, and who stabbed the first knife at Dong-woo.
 Jung Soon-won as Young-jin's co-robber was also arrested at the scene and who stabbed the second knife at Dong-woo.

Choi Hong-seok's Murder Case (Ep. 5)
  as Kim In-hwan (58-year-old)
 Teacher and the perpetrator. His son, Kim Ji-hoon, was killed by Choi Hong-seok in the military enlistment.
 Hong Boo-hyang as Ji-hoon's mother
 Woo Hyeon as Go Man-seok (48-year-old), rest stop owner
 Im Kang-sung as Ma Young-gil (30-year-old), professional baseball player
  as Lee Dae-hwan (27-year-old), former prisoner and tow truck driver
  as Hwang Do-kyung (27-year-old), Ministry of Strategy and Finance's IT Officer's secretary

Impersonation and Jo Dong-ik's Murder Case (Ep. 6)
 Seo Eun-ah as Kim Mi-soo, perpetrator
  as Yoon Young-joo, victim
  as victim Go Ah-ra's mother
  as Mi-soo's ex-boyfriend

Seon-Hwa Dressmaking Shop's Fire Case (Ep. 8)
 Ahn Yong-joon as Kim Hee-joon, perpetrator
 Yoon Mi-hyang as Seon-Hwa dressmaking shop's owner
  as Sook-jin, shop owner opposite of Seon-Hwa shop and Hee-joon's mother

Chain Murder Case (Ep. 7, 9–16)
 as Yoo Ok-hee, Jung Ho-young's old mother (Ep. 9)

Others

 Hong Gi-joon as Hwayang Police Station's detective in 1986
 Kang Seok-won as Hwayang Police Station's detective in 1986
 Choi Jae-hyuk
 Han Sang-gil
 Jung Dong-hoon
 Jung Young-geum
 Jung Mi-hye
 Lee Jin-mok
 Han Sang-woo
 Hyun Jeong-cheol
 Dang Hyun-seok
 Kim In-ho
 Go Bong-goo
 Jo Jeong-hoon
 Kang Ji-hoon
 Lee Kang-young
 Park Se-joon
 Jung Dae-yong
 Kim Min-sung
 Kwak Min-gyu
 Kim Jong-ho
 Gong Soo-min as the older sister between two children who lost a puppy (Ep. 1)
 Kim Ji-an as the younger sister between two children who lost a puppy (Ep. 1) 
 Kim Tae-young
 Lee Soo-yeon as Seo Jeong-eun, daughter of Lee Seon-ok's victim (Ep. 2)
 Lee Jae-eun as Park Gwang-ho and Shin Jae-yi's house owner (Ep. 2)
 Park Jong-bo
 Lee Beom-chan 
 Jang Won-jin
 Yoo Kyung-hoon
 Kim Ki-beom
 Lee Seon-young
 Shim Sang-woo
 Kim Eun-hae
 Kim Yoo-jin
 Yoon Seo-jeong
 Jin Jeong-gwan
 Yoo Jae-ik
 Park Eun-young
 Lee Joo-young
 Kim Young-hee 
 Lee Jae-eun as the woman is eating with two children in the restaurant (Ep. 4)
 Park Jin-sung
 Shin Tae-hyun
 Choi Hye-jeong
 Yoo Kyung-hoon
 Park In-jeong
 Park Ok-chool
 Jo Yong-sang
 Oh Sang-hwa
 Kim Sang-il
 Jung Tae-ya
 Choi Hyun-joon
 Lee Do-gyeom
 Cha Jae-man
 Choi Young-min 
 Kwon Ban-seok as detective, Kim Seon-jae's former partner who lost Jung Ho-young at the police station (Ep. 5)
 Uhm Ok-ran
 Kim Do-hyung
 Choi Na-moo
 Kim Nam-hee
 Lee Dong-gyu
 Jo Hyun-jin
  as Choi Hong-seok's military enlistment teammate (Ep. 5)
 Park Ik-joon
 Kim Jong-doo
 Kwon Jin-ran 
 Kang Hak-soo
 Son In-yong
 Kim Kyung-min
 Min Hyo-kyung
 Jung Hee-young
 Jung Hee-jong
 Seo Jeong-joon
 
 Shin Yool-yi
 Jin Myung-seon
 
 Jang Hyo-min
 Han Hye-mi
 Choi Da-young
 Kim Beo-deul
 Park Sung-min 
 Lee Jeong-joo
 Kim Nam-hee
 Park Ji-yeon
 Nam Jeong-hee as Gwang-ho (born 1988)'s old hometown neighborhood woman (Ep. 6)
 Park Seung-tae as Gwang-ho (born 1988)'s old hometown neighborhood woman (Ep. 6)
 Seo Woo-jin
 Baek In-kwon
 Kim Jin-woo
 Seo Dong-gyu
 Lee Seung-yeon as Jin Sung-cheol, younger brother of Jin Seon-mi (Jung Ho-young's sixth victim in 1986) (Ep. 6)
 Seo Young-sam
 Ha Min
 Kim Nam-hee as Yoon-hui
 Ahn Soo-bin
 Joo Hye-min 
 Yoo Yong-beom
 Ji Sung-geun as shopping guy (Ep. 8)
 Choi Gyo-sik as Oh Young-dal, cellphone shop owner (Ep. 8)
 Kim Bi-bi
 Jeon Byung-deok
 Heo Seon-haeng as man in the shopping store (Ep. 8)
 Oh Seung-hee
  as old woman in Mooyoung Clinic (Ep. 8)
 Min Dae-sik
 Park Cheol-min 
 Jo Seung-yeon as Hwayang police station's department head (Ep. 9)
 Park Sang-yong
 Jo Sung-yoon
 Nam Sang-baek
 Jo Huin-dol
 Jeon Jae-hyun
 Im Sung-pyo as Hwayang police station chief in 2016 (Ep. 9)
 Baek Hyun-joo as Jung Ho-young's older sister-in-law (Ep. 9)
 Yoo Min-ja as Jung Ho-young's mother-in-law (Ep. 9)
 Kim Young-seon as Jung Ho-young's psychiatrist in 1987 (Ep. 9)
 Yoon Jin-sol as Haein river victim Yoon Da-young's friend (Ep. 9)
 Oh Hyo-jin 
 Kim Kwang-tae
 Park Jae-won
 Baek Seung-ah
 Ok Joo-ri as Jung Ho-young's younger sister Jung Hye-ji's neighbor (Ep. 10)
 Hong Hee-ra
 So Joon-hyung
 Han Ji-ho
 Ahn Jang-hoon 
 Lee Taek-geun
 Won Seo-ho
 Lee Eun-seok
 Kim Sung-yeon
 Kim Jeong-min 
 Park Jin-soo
  as Shin-Hae Chemical's former employee (Ep. 12)
 Kang Woon
 Yoo Byung-seon as Hwayang police station's criminal team 2's detective Kim (Ep. 12)
 Jang Hyun-jeong
 Yoon Hyo-jin 
 Moon Gi-young
 Lee Hyun-eung
 Jo Hyun-geon
 Lee Ja-ryung
 Lee Soo-ja
 Choi Jeong-ja
 Noh Tae-young
 Jo Min-jae 
 
 Cha Do-yeon 
 Kang Yoon-jeong
 Yoon Boo-jin
 Kim Jae-cheol
 Go Tae-young
 Kim Moon-ho
 Han Seung-hyun
 Ryoo Jeong 
 Park Yong-jin as father of Kim Kyung-soon (Jung Ho-young's second victim) (Ep. 16)
 Lee Young-hee as mother of Lee Jeong-sook (Jung Ho-young's first victim) (Ep. 16)
 Kim Doo-hee
 Yoo Chang-sook as mother of Hwang Choon-hee (Jung Ho-young's third victim) (Ep. 16)
 Kim Won-joong
 Yoo Young-bok

Special appearances
  as Kim Jong-doo, forensic doctor of Hwayang public health center in 1986 (Ep. 1)
 Oh Yoon-hong as Madam Jung, owner of Rose cafe in front of the police station in 1986 (Ep. 1)
  as Hwayang police station chief in 1986 (Ep. 1)
  as Lee Geum-soon (Ep. 3)
  as priest in the church where Jung Ho-young came to confession after he killed the seventh woman in 2016 (Ep. 4)
 Choi Il-hwa as Yoo Sung-jae, pharmacist loved unilaterally Yeon-sook after Gwang-ho was believed dead in 1986 (Ep. 8)
  as senior police officer (Ep. 9)
  as Kim Kyung-tae (Ep. 12)
 Kim Ji-sung as Hwayang police station's criminal team 2's leader (Ep. 15)
  as Park Kwang-ho (born 1988)'s mother (Ep. 16)

Original soundtrack

Ratings
In this table,  represent the lowest ratings and  represent the highest ratings.

Remake
An Indonesian adaptation starring Donny Alamsyah and Hana Malasan, and directed by Ifa Isfansyah as one of the three directors assigned to direct different episodes, Tanya Yuson and Shanty Harmayn served as the showrunners, while Fourcolors Films produce the show.

References

External links
  
 
 
 

OCN television dramas
Korean-language television shows
2017 South Korean television series debuts
2017 South Korean television series endings
South Korean thriller television series
South Korean crime television series
South Korean time travel television series
South Korean television series remade in other languages
Television series set in 1986
Television series set in 2016
Television series by Studio Dragon